Miguel Marín (born February 16, 1989 in Tijuana, Baja California) is a Mexican professional footballer who plays for Atlante of Ascenso MX on loan from Sinaloa.

External links
Ascenso MX 

Liga MX players
Living people
1989 births
Mexican footballers
Sportspeople from Tijuana
Association footballers not categorized by position